John Mwengani (born 30 December 1994) is a Zambian football defender who currently plays for Kansanshi Dynamos F.C.

References

1994 births
Living people
Zambian footballers
Zambia international footballers
Kansanshi Dynamos F.C. players
Konkola Blades F.C. players
Forest Rangers F.C. players
Nkana F.C. players
Nakambala Leopards F.C. players
Association football defenders
Zambia A' international footballers
2018 African Nations Championship players